Lüdinghausen (Westphalian: Lünkhusen or Lünksel) is a town in district of Coesfeld in the state of North Rhine-Westphalia, Germany. It is located on the Dortmund-Ems Canal, approx. 25 km south-west of Münster.

Town parts
The town of Lüdinghausen includes the village of Seppenrade, where the ammonite Parapuzosia seppenradensis was found in 1895.

History
Lüdinghausen was founded in the thirteenth century and received its first city charter around 1308.

Transportation
Lüdinghausen is situated at the Dortmund-Enschede railway, and has a train station (Lüdinghausen railway station).

Sights
Lüdinghausen is known for its three castles, Castle Luedinghausen, Kakesbeck Castle and Vischering Castle.

Twin towns – sister cities

Lüdinghausen is twinned with:
 Nysa, Poland
 Taverny, France

Notable people
Holger Blume (born 1973), springer
Marc Blume (born 1973), sprinter
Marie Theres Fögen (1946–2008), jurist and historian
Franz Kamphaus (born 1932), Roman Catholic bishop
Johannes Kriege (1859–1937), jurist and politician (DVP)
Wiebke Muhsal (born 1986), politician (AfD)
Amos Pieper (born 1998), footballer
Bettina Schausten (born 1965), journalist
Karin Schnaase (born 1985), badminton player
Bernd Strasser (born 1936), water polo player
Heiner Thade (born 1942), modern penthalete
Wilm Weppelmann (born 1957), artist
Franz Wernekinck (1764–1839), physician and botanist
Jens Albert (born 1973), rapper

References

External links
 (in German)

 
Deerfield, Illinois
Coesfeld (district)